Gerardo Francisco Liceaga Arteaga (born 3 October 1960) is a Mexican sports journalist and politician affiliated with the PRI. He currently serves as Deputy of the LXII Legislature of the Mexican Congress representing the State of Mexico.

Since 1985 until 2009 he was reporter and anchor of Televisa Deportes covering events as the FIFA World Cup. In 2009 he was elected as Municipal President of Teoloyucan.

References

1960 births
Living people
Politicians from the State of Mexico
Mexican sports journalists
Male journalists
Members of the Chamber of Deputies (Mexico)
Institutional Revolutionary Party politicians
21st-century Mexican politicians
Deputies of the LXII Legislature of Mexico